Tishreen Sports Club is a Syrian professional football club based in Latakia. The club was founded in 1947 and currently competes in the Syrian Premier League. Its home ground is Al-Assad Stadium. Tishreen is the most successful and respected Syrian football club today, winning five league titles.

History
In 1946, Al-Sahel Club was the first officially licensed club in Lattakia, and it was necessary to have another club in order to enhance the spirit of competition and advance the level of sport in Lattakia.

In 1947, the Al-Jalaa Club was founded. The first headquarters taken for this club after its birth was behind Jules Jamal School, currently in the house of Al-Mara'ash, and the first administrative body formed was as follows:

And the team consisted of: Abdullah Issa, Abdel Wahab Issa, Hamza Issa, Mohamed Odeima, Khaled Kordaghli, Kamal Gharib, Mohamed Ghazal, Youssef Abdel, Othman Tarifi, Mohamed Ten, Mohamed Shaar, Abdullah Abd, Musa Homaisi, a goalkeeper. And very quickly. The club made a leap to stardom and championship.

Predecessors of the Tishreen SC
 Al-Jalaa Club was established in 1947 (Football)
 Hurriya Club was founded in 1952 (Basketball and Volleyball)
 Lattakia Club in 1954 (Basketball and Volleyball)
 Al-Arabi Lattakia Club was established in 1962 (Football)
 Al-Wathba Club Lattakia was established in 1963 (Football)
 Al-Liwaa Club was established in 1963 (Football)

Merging of sports clubs in Latakia
1- The previous clubs (Al-Jalaa + Al-Hurriya + Al-Liwaa) merged under the name Al-Qadisiyah Syrian Club in 1971.

2- The previous clubs (Latakia + Al Arabi + Al Wathba) merged under the name of the Syrian Al-Nahda Club in 1971.

3- Al-Nahda and Al-Qadisiyah clubs merged into Tishreen Club in 1977.

Thus, we consider that Tishreen Club was founded with the establishment of its oldest club, Al-Jalaa Club.
The first match that the club played after its founding against the Syrian Naval Forces team and won (3-1).

The first foreign match the team played in Tripoli with its champion and the match ended in a draw (2 - 2). The two goals of the match were scored by Abdul Wahab Issa.

1982 season

King Abouda (Abdul Kader Kardaghli): “The Tishreen team at the time in 1982 was one of the strongest teams in Syria and was prepared to maintain the league championship for several years, but the team was dispersed after the decision to rebuild the municipal stadium (currently Al-Basil) and the maintenance work in it, which lasted three or four Years, during which we played in Tartous and Jableh, and despite that, we remained one of the teams competing for the championship and finished in the top three, before the players started leaving the club, such as Al-Najjar and Al-Badi to Jableh and Al-Qudamati to travel.

When we were playing in the past, we did not think about money, and all our thoughts were limited to how to make people happy with our performance and results. The joy that we saw in people’s eyes is priceless, and I remember one time that in the national team we returned from Jordan to Damascus and people were cheering for us (and throwing rice at us). I wish they would only think about these things, for making people happy is worth billions, but it needs a conscience".

Stadium

Achievements
Syrian League: 5
Champion: 1982, 1997, 2019–20, 2020–21, 2021–22
Runner-up: 2016–17, 2018–19
Syrian Cup:
Runner-up: 1973, 1978, 1988, 2004, 2006
Syrian Super Cup: 1
Champion: 1982

Performance in AFC competitions
AFC Cup: 2 appearances
2021: Group Stage
2022: Group Stage
AFC Cup Winners Cup: 1 appearance
2001–02: First Round
Arab Club Champions Cup: 2 appearances
1982–83: First Round 
2004–05: First Round

Players

Current squad

Notable players
For all current and former Tishreen SC players with a Wikipedia article, see: Tishreen SC players.

References

External links
 Official site

Football clubs in Syria
Association football clubs established in 1947
Sport in Latakia
1947 establishments in Syria